Mucilaginibacter litoreus is a Gram-negative, facultatively aerobic, non-spore-forming and rod-shaped bacterium from the genus of Mucilaginibacter which has been isolated from marine sand from the western coast of Korea.

References

External links
Type strain of Mucilaginibacter litoreus at BacDive -  the Bacterial Diversity Metadatabase

Sphingobacteriia
Bacteria described in 2012